IRTP may have the following meanings:

 Instituto Nacional de Radio y Televisión del Perú
 Internal Revenue Tax Paid, often printed on beer barrels in the US, equivalent to "Duty Paid" outside the USA
 Internet Reliable Transaction Protocol
 Intensive Remedial Teaching Programme in Special Education Need
 Intensive Residential Treatment Program, a residential program for youth who require an intensive, out-of-home treatment intervention
 Inter-Registrar Transfer Policy